Belinda Bencic was the defending champion, but lost in the second round to Elena Vesnina.

Dominika Cibulková won the title, defeating Karolína Plíšková in the final, 7–5, 6–3.

Seeds
All seeds received a bye into the second round.

Draw

Finals

Top half

Section 1

Section 2

Bottom half

Section 3

Section 4

Qualifying

Seeds

Qualifiers

Lucky losers

Draw

First qualifier

Second qualifier

Third qualifier

Fourth qualifier

Fifth qualifier

Sixth qualifier

Seventh qualifier

Eighth qualifier

References
 Main Draw
 Qualifying Draw

Aegon Internationalandnbsp;- Singles
2016 Singles